Turbonilla macandreae is a species of sea snail, a marine gastropod mollusk in the family Pyramidellidae, the pyrams and their allies.

Nomenclature
Replacement name for Turbonilla speciosa H. Adams, 1869, not A. Adams, 1860

Distribution
This species occurs in the following locations:
 European waters (ERMS scope)

References

 Adams H. 1871. Descriptions of twenty-six new species of shells collected by Robert M'Andrew, Esq., in the Red Sea. Proceedings of the Zoological Society of London, 1870: 788-793

External links
 To Biodiversity Heritage Library (1 publication)
 To CLEMAM
 To Encyclopedia of Life
 To World Register of Marine Species

macandreae
Gastropods described in 1871